The 2015 Nordic Figure Skating Championships was held from February 11 to 15, 2015 at the DNB Arena in Stavanger, Norway. Skaters competed in the disciplines of men's singles and ladies' singles on the senior, junior, and novice levels.

Senior results

Men

Ladies

Junior medalists

Men

Ladies

References

External links
 results

Nordic Figure Skating Championships
Nordic Figure Skating Championships
Nordic Championships, 2015
2015 in Norwegian sport